Moskovka is a rural locality (a settlement) in Michurinsky Selsoviet, Khabarsky District, Altai Krai, Russia. The population was 88 as of 2013. It was founded in 1914. There is 1 street.

Geography 
Moskovka is located 36 km southeast of Khabary (the district's administrative centre) by road. Michurinskoye is the nearest rural locality.

References 

Rural localities in Khabarsky District